John Hawksworth may refer to:

 Johnny Hawksworth, British musician and composer
 John Hawksworth (golfer), English golfer
 John Hawksworth (economist), chief economist for PriceWaterhouseCoopers

See also
 John Hawkesworth (disambiguation)